Claudio Darío Salina (born 25 September 1995) is an Argentine professional footballer who plays as a midfielder for Acassuso CF.

Career
Salina began his career in 2011 with Racing Club in Torneo Argentino B, remaining until 2013 and scoring once in thirty-eight fixtures. In 2014, Salina joined Temperley. He made his professional debut with Primera B Metropolitana side Temperley during the 2013–14 season, featuring for the full ninety minutes of a 2–1 win over UAI Urquiza on 31 March 2014. He made fifteen appearances in 2013–14 and ten in 2014, both campaigns ended with promotion. As Temperley prepped for the 2015 Primera División, Salina left on loan to play in Primera B Metropolitana for Defensores de Belgrano.

Whilst with Defensores de Belgrano, Salina netted the first goals of his senior career against Almirante Brown and Deportivo Español respectively. He returned to Temperley in 2016, but immediately departed on loan again. On 13 April 2016, Deportivo Armenio loaned Salina until the end of the 2016 Primera B Metropolitana season. He made seven appearances as Deportivo Armenio were relegated to Primera C Metropolitana. In April 2017, Salina made his top-flight debut with Temperley versus Gimnasia y Esgrima. In July 2019, Salina joined San Telmo. He left in December 2021.

In January 2022, Salina joined Primera B Metropolitana side Acassuso CF.

Career statistics
.

References

External links

1995 births
Living people
People from San Vicente Partido
Argentine footballers
Association football midfielders
Torneo Argentino B players
Primera B Metropolitana players
Primera Nacional players
Argentine Primera División players
Racing de Trelew players
Club Atlético Temperley footballers
Defensores de Belgrano footballers
Deportivo Armenio footballers
San Telmo footballers
Sportspeople from Buenos Aires Province